Frank Cahill (born 7 May 1922 - 10 June 1982) is a former Australian rules footballer who played with Carlton and Footscray in the Victorian Football League (VFL).

Personal life 
Cahill was the father of Mike Cahill, a professional golfer.

In April 1982, Cahill went into the hospital. He passed away two months later.

Notes

External links 

Frank Cahill's profile at Blueseum

1922 births
1982 deaths
Carlton Football Club players
Western Bulldogs players
Australian rules footballers from Victoria (Australia)
Spotswood Football Club players